Nordbanen is one of six radial S-train lines in Copenhagen. It connects Copenhagen city center with several northern suburbs, and the cities of Hillerød, Birkerød and Allerød

Stations

Service patterns
The weekday service consists of service A which stops at all stations until Holte, and E which runs with limited stops until Holte and then stops at all stations until Hillerød. On weekends and evenings, only service A runs, stopping at all stations.

Between 1950 and 1989 rush-hour and limited-stop on the radial ran under service letters C, Cc and Cx. Service A ran on Nordbanen from 1979 to 2007, first as the stopping service until Holte and later (from 1989) as the limited-stop service to Hillerød.

History
Nordbanen was the second railway to reach Copenhagen in 1863. It was originally the main line to Elsinore before the more direct Kystbanen opened in 1897. The section from Hillerød to Elsinore still exists and is today the Little North Line operated by the railway company Lokaltog.

South of Hellerup the original Nordbanen followed a much more westerly route than the current line, taking it along the present ring line alignment to Ryparken and thence through Nørrebro to the 1863-1911 central station at present-day Kampmannsgade. The trains to Holte and Hillerød moved to the current line in 1921, but the old alignment was used by freight trains until 1930 and still leaves clear traces on a modern street map.

The line from Hellerup to the new central station had four tracks of which trains on Nordbanen used the two western ones and trains on Kystbanen used the two eastern ones. In 1928 two new tracks for local trains
to Klampenborg were added to Kystbanen; these connected to Nordbanen's tracks at Hellerup. Thus when the first S-trains were introduced on the Klampenborg line in 1934 it was the Nordbanen tracks between København H and Hellerup that were electrified. But then plans to also electrify Nordbanen as far as Holte were already underfoot.

Early on, a service pattern had been established in which local trains between Copenhagen and Holte were complemented by trains to Hillerød and Helsingør which ran non-stop until Holte. The local trains to Holte were converted to S-trains in 1936, but trains to Hillerød and beyond were still steam trains for several decades, even though they shared the S-train tracks south of Holte.

The Hillerød trains became a problem in the 1960s when capacity on the central S-train section became a limiting factor for service extensions on the western radials. The steam trains had poor acceleration relative to the S-trains and therefore tied up the tracks for twice as long as an S-train would. In order to free this capacity the line from Holte to Hillerød was electrified in 1968 and the steam trains replaced by S-trains.

The first-class cars were declassified to second class in 1972.

Likewise, the Hillerød trains kept the stopping pattern of the steam trains and ran non-stop all the way from Østerport to Holte. Only from 1989 did this tradition break down, and the Hillerød services gradually gained intermediate stops at Hellerup (1989) and Lyngby (1991), and finally (1995) at all stations between Østerport and Hellerup.

S-train (Copenhagen) lines